Atlas is a census-designated place located in Mount Carmel Township, Northumberland County in the state of Pennsylvania.  The community is located very close to the borough of Mount Carmel along Pennsylvania Route 61.  As of the 2010 census the population was 809 residents.

Demographics

References

Census-designated places in Northumberland County, Pennsylvania
Census-designated places in Pennsylvania